David Hanly (born 1944, Fairgreen, Limerick) is an Irish writer and former broadcaster. He was a co-presenter of RTÉ Radio 1's Morning Ireland for many years. He won a Jacob's Award in 1985. His television show Hanly's People featured in-depth interviews with people such as Seán Boylan and David Norris.

As a writer, Hanly wrote for serial dramas The Kennedys of Castleross, and The Riordans. His novel In Guilt and in Glory was first published in 1979.

In 2001, Hanly campaigned for the establishment of an arts centre on Arthur's Quay, Limerick city.

David's brother Mick was a singer-songwriter known for Past the Point of Rescue (song), and the brothers sometimes performed together.

Bibliography

References

External links

Living people
20th-century Irish people
21st-century Irish people
People from County Limerick
RTÉ newsreaders and journalists
Irish radio presenters
1944 births
Date of birth missing (living people)